The 1930 BYU Cougars football team was an American football team that represented Brigham Young University (BYU) as a member of the Rocky Mountain Conference (RMC) during the 1930 college football season. In their third season under head coach G. Ott Romney, the Cougars compiled an overall record of 5–2–4 with a mark of 4–1–1 against conference opponents, finished third in the RMC, and outscored opponents by a total of 179 to 160.

Schedule

References

BYU
BYU Cougars football seasons
BYU Cougars football